Miloš Živković (Serbian Cyrillic: Милош Живковић; born 5 February 1985) is a Serbian football player.

Career
He starter his career in Belgrade club FK Bežanija youth teams. With the age of 13, he moved to Red Star Belgrade youth football team. He played also for Serbia young national team. Since 2003, he started to play as senior, being loaned to FK Javor, Mladost Lukićevo and FK Železničar Smederevo. After playing one season with OFK Mladenovac, in 2006 he signed with Hajduk Kula making his Serbian Superliga debut. Next season he moved to another top-league club, Borac Čačak, which had what was one of their best years finishing in fourth place, just behind the biggest Serbian clubs. At the end of the season he moved to Tavriya Simferopol, where he stayed one season, returning afterwards to Serbia, this time to play in FK Jagodina.

References

External links

 
 

1985 births
Living people
Footballers from Belgrade
Serbian footballers
Association football defenders
FK Javor Ivanjica players
OFK Mladenovac players
FK Bežanija players
FK Hajduk Kula players
FK Borac Čačak players
SC Tavriya Simferopol players
FK Jagodina players
FK Zemun players
Serbian SuperLiga players
Serbian expatriate footballers
Expatriate footballers in Ukraine
Serbian expatriate sportspeople in Ukraine